Legislative elections were held in France twice in 1946:

June 1946 French legislative election
November 1946 French legislative election